Tun Datuk Seri Utama Syed Ahmad bin Syed Mahmud Shahabuddin (4 May 1925 – 7 July 2008) was a Malaysian politician. He was the Menteri Besar of Kedah from 1967 to 1978 and the fifth Yang di-Pertua Negeri (Governor) of Melaka state from 1984 until 2004, the longest-serving governor of Malacca.

Life
Syed Ahmad was born on 4 May 1925 in Kulim, Kedah, Malaysia. He is the third son of five brothers and sisters. Syed Ahmad received his early education at Sekolah Melayu Kulim (Kulim Malay School) in 1932 till 1935 and continued his education at the Sultan Abdul Hamid College, Alor Star till he passed his Senior Cambridge Examination in 1947.

Syed Ahmad had wide experience and actively engaged in politics. He was the Kedah UMNO Assistant Secretary (1951–1954), Secretary Kedah UMNO (1954–1967), Chairman, UMNO State Liaison Committee and Kedah National Front (1967–1978), UMNO Supreme Council Member (1968–1978), and Deputy chairman, UMNO State Liaison Committee and Kedah National Front (1978–1984).

Syed Ahmad was appointed as Menteri Besar of Kedah (1967–1978) and Deputy Minister, Ministry of Home Affairs (1978–1982 and Malaysia's High Commissioner to Singapore (1982–1984). In 1984, he was appointed as the fifth Yang di-Pertua Negeri (Governor) of Melaka state.

Syed Ahmad married Toh Puan Sharifah Haniffah Syed Alwi in 1950 and they had six children. Toh Puan died on 5 July 1993 in Kuala Lumpur. In 1960, H.E. Tun married Toh Puan Datuk Seri Datin Seri Utama Marfuza Sheikh Mohd Osman and they had 4 children.

Death
Syed Ahmad died on 7 July 2008 at his house in Taman Tun Dr Ismail, Kuala Lumpur. He was 83 years old. His body was buried at Melaka's State Heroes Mausoleum (Makam Pahlawan Negeri) near Al Azim Mosque in Malacca Town, Melaka. He was the first state leader to be buried there.

Legacy
The Sekolah Kebangsaan Tun Syed Ahmad Shahabuddin at Hang Tuah Jaya, Ayer Keroh was named after him.
The Sekolah Menengah Kebangsaan Syed Ahmad at Kuala Nerang was also named after him.
There is the mosque Masjid Tun Syed Ahmad Al-Haj in Bukit Beruang, Melaka was named after him.

Honours and titles
He was awarded :

Titles
He held the title of "Tun Datuk Seri Utama" by combination of his highest Federal Malaysian title "Tun" (SMN) and his highest Malaccan title "Datuk Seri Utama" (DUNM)
In other states of Malaysia, a similar combination between his highest Federal Malaysian title "Tun" (SMN) and his local highest title may be used. Example : Tun Datuk Seri Panglima in Sabah.

Honours of Malacca
 As 5th Yang di-Pertua Negeri of Malacca 4 December 1984 – 3 June 2004 )
  Grand Master and Grand Commander of the Premier and Exalted Order of Malacca (DUNM) with title Datuk Seri Utama
  Grand Master of the Exalted Order of Malacca

Honours of Malaysia
  :
  Companion of the Order of the Defender of the Realm (JMN) (1958)
  :
  Recipient of the Malaysian Commemorative Medal (Silver) (PPM) (1965)
  Commander of the Order of Loyalty to the Crown of Malaysia (PSM) – Tan Sri (1979) 
  Grand Commander of the Order of Loyalty to the Crown of Malaysia (SSM) – Tun (1987)
  Grand Commander Order of the Defender of the Realm (SMN) – Tun (1989)
  :
 Justice of the peace (JP) of Kedah
  Companion of the Exalted Order of the Crown of Kedah (SMK) (1965)
  Knight Grand Commander of the Exalted Order of the Crown of Kedah (SPMK) – Dato' Seri (1968)
  Knight Grand Companion of the Order of Loyalty to the Royal House of Kedah (SSDK) – Dato' Seri (1976)
  :
  Knight Grand Commander of the Order of the Crown of Selangor (SPMS) – Dato' Seri
:
  Knight Commander of the Order of the Star of Sarawak (PNBS) – Dato Sri
  Knight Grand Commander of the Order of the Star of Hornbill Sarawak (DP) – Datuk Patinggi
  :
  Commander of the Order of Kinabalu (PGDK) – Datuk
  Grand Commander of the Order of Kinabalu (SPDK) – Datuk Seri Panglima

References
 Ex-Malacca governor laid to rest – The Star, 8 July 2008

Chief Ministers of Kedah
Malaysian people of Arab descent
1925 births
2008 deaths
People from Kedah
Malaysian people of Malay descent
Malaysian Muslims
United Malays National Organisation politicians
Members of the Dewan Negara
Members of the Dewan Rakyat
Members of the Kedah State Legislative Assembly
Kedah state executive councillors
High Commissioners of Malaysia to Singapore
Yang di-Pertua Negeri of Malacca